The Toyota 91C-V is a Group C sports prototype racing car, developed and built by Toyota intended to participate in the World Sportscar Championship, the 24 Hours of Le Mans, and the All-Japan Japanese Sports-Prototype Championship. It is an evolution of the previous 90C-V. Its powerplant is a turbocharged  Toyota V8 engine, producing . It won 3 races (including 1 class win), achieved 6 podium finishes, and scored 3 pole positions.

References

Group C cars
91C-V